Cigaritis tavetensis, the Taveta silverline, is a butterfly in the family Lycaenidae. It is found in western Tanzania. The habitat consists of savanna.

They feed on Acacia drepanolobium within galls. They are associated with ants of the genus Pheidole.

References

External links
Die Gross-Schmetterlinge der Erde 13: Die Afrikanischen Tagfalter. Plate XIII 69 g

Butterflies described in 1906
Cigaritis